The Avhustynivka Rural Council (officially, Avhustynivka Village Council) is one of 16 rural local government areas of the Zaporizhia Raion (district) of Zaporizhia Oblast in southern Ukraine. Its population was 3,008 in the 2001 Ukrainian Census.

It was established by the Verkhovna Rada, Ukraine's parliament, on 7 December 1990. The council's administrative center is located in the village of Avhustynivka.

Government
Its local government council consists of 20 locally-elected deputies. The council is represented by the No.82 single-mandate constituency for parliamentary elections in Ukraine.

Populated settlements
The Avhustynivka Rural Council's jurisdiction includes six villages: 
 Avhustynivka (pop. 1,017)
 Ivanhorod (pop. 32)
 Lemeshynske (pop. 38)
 Novoselysche (pop. 88)
 Pryvitne (pop. 190)
 Svitanok (pop. 268)

In addition, the rural settlement of Vidradne (pop. 1,375) falls under the council's jurisdiction.

References

Zaporizhzhia Raion
States and territories established in 1990
1990 establishments in Ukraine